William James Harris (1835 – 29 October 1911) was a Conservative Party politician.

Harris was elected MP for Poole at a by-election in 1884. However, in 1885 the seat was abolished and Harris sought re-election in Ashburton, where he was unsuccessful.

References

External links
 

Conservative Party (UK) MPs for English constituencies
UK MPs 1880–1885
1835 births
1911 deaths